Don Megowan (May 24, 1922 – June 26, 1981) was an American actor. He played the Gill-man on land in The Creature Walks Among Us, the final part of the Creature from the Black Lagoon trilogy.

Early life
Don Megowan was born in Inglewood, California to Robert and Leila (née Dale) Megowan. His mother Leila worked as a negative cutter for Pathé. At 6'7" Megowan was very active in sports, playing baseball, football, and throwing discus. He went to the University of Southern California on a football scholarship before serving in the United States Army during World War II.

Career
Megowan starred in the science fiction films The Werewolf in the role of Sheriff Jack Haines, in The Creation of the Humanoids (1962) as a captain in the anti-robot Order of Flesh and Blood, who must stop the Humanoids, and in The Creature Walks Among Us as the Gill-man.

Megowan also appeared in westerns: Davy Crockett, King of the Wild Frontier (1955), The Great Locomotive Chase (1956), Tarzan and the Valley of Gold (1966), The Devil's Brigade (1968), and Mel Brooks Blazing Saddles (1974).

In 1962, he starred with Cameron Mitchell in the television series, The Beachcomber. He guest starred in various programs, including the westerns: Gunsmoke, Wagon Train (twice), The Californians, The Tall Man, Maverick, Cimarron City, Have Gun–Will Travel, Tales of Wells Fargo, The Rifleman, Lawman, Cheyenne, Colt .45, Bonanza, The Americans, Rawhide, and Daniel Boone. He was also cast in episodes of such series as Angel, U.S. Marshal, Get Smart, and Fantasy Island.

Death
Megowan, a smoker from age 12 to 48, died of throat cancer at age 59. His weight had dwindled from nearly 300 pounds to barely 150.

Filmography

1951: The Mob .... Bruiser - Big Longshoreman at Union Hall (uncredited)
1951: On the Loose .... Club Emerald Headwaiter (uncredited)
1951: The Kid from Amarillo .... Rakim
1953: Sangaree .... River Pirate (uncredited)
1954: Prince Valiant .... Sir Lancelot (uncredited)
1955: Davy Crockett, King of the Wild Frontier .... William Travis
1955: To Catch a Thief .... Detective at Costume Ball (uncredited)
1955: A Lawless Street .... Dooley Brion
1956: Anything Goes .... Henri (uncredited)
1956: The Creature Walks Among Us .... Gill-man on land (uncredited)
1956: The Great Locomotive Chase .... Marion A. Ross
1956: The Werewolf .... Sheriff Jack Haines
1956: The Loretta Young Show  S4Ep12 "The End of the Week"  .... Hank Curtis
1956: Gun the Man Down .... Ralph Farley
1957: The Delicate Delinquent .... Policeman (uncredited)
1957: Hell Canyon Outlaws .... Henchman Walt
1957: The Story of Mankind .... Early Man 
1958: Snowfire .... Mike McGowan
1958: The Man Who Died Twice .... T. J. Brennan
1958: A Lust to Kill .... Cheney Holland
1958: Money, Women and Guns .... John Briggs
1958: The Buccaneer .... Pirate with Axe (uncredited)
1958: Tales of Frankenstein (TV Short) .... The Monster
1958: Cheyenne.... Gregg Dewey in Episode "Dead to Rights" 
1959: The Jayhawkers! .... China
1959: Bonanza .... John C. Regan in Episode "The Magnificent Adah"
1960: Road of the Giants / La strada dei giganti .... Clint Farrell
1961: Guns of the Black Witch .... Jean
1961: Cheyenne.... Sheriff Tom Grant
1962: The Creation of the Humanoids .... Capt. Kenneth Cragis
1962: The Beachcomber (TV Series) .... Capt.Huckabee
1963: For Love or Money .... Gregor Garrison
1966: Tarzan and the Valley of Gold .... Mr. Train
1967: Border Lust
1968: The Devil's Brigade .... Luke Pehelan
1968: If He Hollers, Let Him Go! .... Officer
1974: Scream of the Wolf (TV Movie) .... Grant
1974: Blazing Saddles .... Gum Chewer
1974: Melvin Purvis: G-Man (TV Movie) .... Hamburger Stand Man
1974: Truck Turner .... Garrity
1975: The Kansas City Massacre (TV Movie) .... Boss Stringer
1977: The Great Gundown .... Baldy
1979: Mrs. R's Daughter (TV Movie) .... Larsen (final film role)

References

Sources
 The American Film Institute catalog of motion pictures ..., Numbers 1941–1950 by American Film Institute
 Science Fiction Stars and Horror Heroes: Interviews with Actors, Directors ... by Tom Weaver

External links

1922 births
1981 deaths
American male film actors
American male television actors
Male actors from Los Angeles
Male actors from Inglewood, California
Military personnel from California
20th-century American male actors
Western (genre) television actors
United States Army personnel of World War II
University of Southern California alumni